The fifteenth season of the Case Closed anime was directed by Masato Satō and produced by TMS Entertainment and Yomiuri Telecasting Corporation. The series is based on Gosho Aoyama's Case Closed manga series. In Japan, the series is titled  but was changed due to legal issues with the title Detective Conan. The episodes' plot follows Conan Edogawa's daily adventures.

The episodes use six pieces of theme music: three opening themes and three ending themes.

The season initially ran from January 23, 2006, through February 19, 2007 on Nippon Television Network System in Japan. Episodes 427 to 465 were later collected into ten DVD compilations by Shogakukan. They were released between December 22, 2006, and September 28, 2007, in Japan.


Episode list

References
General

Specific

2006 Japanese television seasons
2007 Japanese television seasons
Season15